Joseph Reid (17 March 1905 – 8 February 1968) was an English freestyle sport wrestler who competed for Great Britain in the 1932 Summer Olympics. He was born in Leigh, Lancashire, and was trained by fellow Leigh native, Harry Pennington.

Wrestling career
In 1932, he competed in the freestyle bantamweight tournament of the Olympic Games. Reid was eliminated after losing two of his three matches in the freestyle bantamweight division and finished fifth over all.

At the 1930 Empire Games, he won the silver medal in the bantamweight class. Four years later, he won the bronze medal in the bantamweight category at the 1934 Empire Games. Reid won the British bantamweight championship every year from 1931 to 1935. Shortly afterwards, he turned professional and continued wrestling well into the 1960s.

Other activities and legacy
Reid fought in the Second World War, and spent time as a prisoner of war in a Japanese-run internment camp. He helped to train Scottish wrestler George Kidd. Reid's wrestling boots are now on display at the Leigh Harriers athletic club.

References

External links
 Joseph Reid's profile at Sports Reference.com

1905 births
1968 deaths
Sportspeople from Leigh, Greater Manchester
English male wrestlers
Commonwealth Games bronze medallists for England
Commonwealth Games silver medallists for England
Olympic wrestlers of Great Britain
Wrestlers at the 1932 Summer Olympics
British male sport wrestlers
Wrestlers at the 1930 British Empire Games
Wrestlers at the 1934 British Empire Games
Commonwealth Games medallists in wrestling
British military personnel of World War II
British World War II prisoners of war
World War II prisoners of war held by Japan
Medallists at the 1930 British Empire Games
Medallists at the 1934 British Empire Games